The 1954 Duke Blue Devils football team represented the Duke University as a member of the Atlantic Coast Conference (ACC) during the 1954 college football season. Duke won the ACC title and finished the season ranked 14th in the final AP Poll.

Schedule

References

Duke
Duke Blue Devils football seasons
Atlantic Coast Conference football champion seasons
Orange Bowl champion seasons
Duke Blue Devils football